Rock Camp is an unincorporated community in Monroe County, West Virginia, United States. Rock Camp is located on U.S. Route 219, northeast of Peterstown and southwest of Union.

The community was named after nearby Rock Camp Creek.

References

Unincorporated communities in Monroe County, West Virginia
Unincorporated communities in West Virginia